Enrique Conrado Sieburger (18 November 1897 – 1965) was an Argentine sailor and Olympic medalist. He competed at the 1948 and 1952 Summer Olympics.

He was a member of the Argentine crew on Djinn that received a silver medal in the 6m class  at the 1948 Summer Olympics in London. His teammates included his brother Julio Sieburger and his son Enrique Sieburger (born 1924); meanwhile Julio's son Roberto Sieburger was also competing in a different event (Three Person Keelboat) in the first of his five Olympics.

His sons Carlos Sieburger (1921 – 1996) and Enrique Sieburger Jr. (1924 – 1990) raced with his nephew Roberto in the 5.5m class at the 1960 Olympics, coming fourth.

His daughter Marylin married four-time Olympian sailor Jorge del Río Salas, cousin of five-time Olympic sailor Jorge Salas Chávez. Altogether, the combined Sieburger-Salas extended family have twenty Olympic appearances, a record for any family in any sport.

References

1897 births
1965 deaths
Argentine male sailors (sport)
Olympic sailors of Argentina
Sailors at the 1948 Summer Olympics – 6 Metre
Sailors at the 1952 Summer Olympics – 6 Metre
Olympic silver medalists for Argentina
Argentine people of German descent
Olympic medalists in sailing
Medalists at the 1948 Summer Olympics